Jim Junior Abgelina Muñoz (born 18 May 1987) is a Filipino professional footballer who plays as a defender for Philippines Football League club Stallion Laguna and the Philippines national team.

Early life
Junior was born and raised in Haarlem, The Netherlands, where he started to play football at the age of six for the local club SV Hoofddorp.
In 2001, he was scouted to play in the youth academy of HFC Haarlem, a First-division Professional Football Club in The Netherlands.

Club career
Muñoz signed for Kaya F.C. in the Philippines United Football League in 2012. After some successful seasons Muñoz got the options & was given offers by some clubs and finally he signed for Stallion Laguna F.C. Muñoz signed again to his former club Kaya F.C. at the start of the season in 2015, that year when the same club bagged the United Football League (Philippines) Champion Title. Muñoz signed with Ceres–Negros F.C. in January 2017 & became Asean Zonal AFC Cup Champion where he was included in the Asean AFC selection team & chosen as the best right-back defender/attacker in the Asean AFC Cup.  Muñoz was also instrumental with effective assist helping & securing Ceres Negros team bagged the Philippine Football League Champion title in 2017. Currently Muñoz has been competing in the Preliminary Stage AFC Champions League 2018. Defeated Shan United F.C. Myanmar side and defeated Brisbane Roar FC in Australia.

International career
Muñoz played in the AFC Cup for Kaya F.C. back in 2016 and was instrumental with effective numbers of assist on goals & defense during the AFC tournament in May 2016 held in Singapore, Maldives & Hong Kong. In one of the highlights, Muñoz effectively executed a very fine cross pass to OJ Porteria in scoring a goal on stoppage-time to force a 1–0 win against New Radiant F.C. from Maldives. In this tournament KAYA F.C. propelled one of the first two premier football clubs from the Philippines able to reach the AFC Cup 16-team level in Asia, so far in the history.  
Philippine AZKALS –  
Muñoz received his first call up for the Philippine national football team in August 2016 for a friendly against Turkmenistan. The friendly was later cancelled. Muñoz made his debut on September 6, 2016 in a friendly against Kyrgyzstan coming in as  a substitute for Kevin Ingreso in the second half. Muñoz executed  a very fine headball assist, helping Misagh Bahadoran score a goal and thus helped Azkals win the match. Muñoz made his second appearance for Azkals on October 10, 2016 by substituting James Joseph Younghusband as right-wing attacker in the second half during the friendly match against North Korea. Muñoz has been part of the Philippines national football team ever since and partly competed in the 2019 AFC Asian Cup.

References

1987 births
Living people
Philippines international footballers
Filipino footballers
Citizens of the Philippines through descent
Association football defenders
Stallion Laguna F.C. players
Kaya F.C. players
Ceres–Negros F.C. players